Elysia Chuquimia Paula Crampton is an American electronic musician, producer, poet, and composer. Her work touches upon themes of Aymara survival and Latino culture, LGBT and Aymara femme heritage, science fiction, references to Christian faith and ontology, and frequent utilization of samples and arrangements from varying sources.

Career 
Elysia Crampton began making music under the name E+E ("And & And" in Spanish) in the early 2000s. E+E consisted of several performers and contributing writers, editors, and DJ mixes made with a keyboard, acapellas, and a sampler.

In 2015, Crampton ceased using the E+E alias and released her first studio album, American Drift, under her real name. The album took three years to make and was made as a way to describe her unique experience of finding a home in Virginia in the aforementioned years. The album was released on August 7, 2015, and was met with critical success. The music review website Pitchfork gave the album an 8.1 out of 10 and said, in praise:

The Virginia producer Elysia Crampton's debut album is only four songs long, but it represents a monumental undertaking. She has described it as an exploration of Virginia's history as well as a meditation on brownness, on being Latina, and as a kind of geology. Her epiphanies feel hard-won, and they shine all the more brightly for it.

Crampton released her second album, Elysia Crampton Presents: Demon City, on July 22, 2016. It was a collaboration with friends/peers including Houston producer Rabit, Danish producer Why Be, London producer Lexxi, and Alabama producer Chino Amobi. Music review Web site Tiny Mix Tapes gave the album a 4.5 out of 5, while Pitchfork said: "Demon City, Virginia producer Elysia Crampton's follow-up to her sumptuous debut American Drift, is a wonder of concision and represents another massive leap forward in her growth," of the album.

Crampton's physical output to date has consisted solely of project studio or home studio recordings, with her first two LP's The Light That You Gave Me To See You (2012) and American Drift (2015), as well as EP's Bound Adam 2011 and Moth/Lake (2015) all being recorded in her Ford Ranger truck.

Musical style 
Crampton's music is notable for drawing from an eclectic and wide variety of influences, including cumbia, and Andean music like huayno and tarqueada, as well as American genres like crunk, metal, ambient, R&B and minimalism. However, her eclecticism is owed to her understanding and incorporation of Aymara ontology in her music, specifically the concepts of taypi and ch'ixi. As a way of summing up her intent to a style, she has used the tags prog and folk to describe her music.

During the time of the making of Elysia's album American Drift, she was living in rural Virginia and being inspired by the expansive local geographical features around the area, described as "wild Southern surroundings", in the area, one of which was the Shenandoah Mountain. She previously made journeys around it, with one inspiring track two of American Drift, 'Petrichrist'. Elysia is heavily inspired by varying forms of cultural music and the interesting sound design that often accompanies them, although her upbringing and roots in music that have influenced her show their presence. In an interview, she remarked that "the older I get, the uglier I want my music to feel, to be".

Through music, the post-colonial divide between Peru and Bolivia was bridged for me, and I was allowed to glimpse an ancient, illusive moment of my heritage that barred nationalistic dividings. The mixture of electronic and acoustic sounds, especially in huayno, provided inspiration that has stuck to this day. The incorporation of these textures into my own voice never had to be deliberately sought out; these ancestral/familial narratives, languages, tones, colors… moved with me as I musically came of age.

Crampton also cited many individuals as influences for her 2015 album American Drift, including José Esteban Muñoz (a noted Cuban-American queer theorist), black pianist Margaret Bonds, Jeffrey Jerome Cohen (a writer and professor in Medieval studies) and queer performance artist, photographer and close friend Boychild.

Crampton has said that her 2016 album, Elysia Crampton Presents: Demon City, was written in the style of a musical epic poem. She said that the album was inspired by Aymaran revolutionary Bartolina Sisa, who is often remembered in indigenous history. The album is a companion piece to Crampton's theatrical production & DJ set, Dissolution of the Sovereign: A Timeslide into the Future, written and performed as both a 'visual & performative essay', a sci-fi style play, and an ontological coda to Sisa's story with a narrative revolving around her severed limbs.

An album of Native American classical and folk, "Quirquincho Medicine", was released under Crampton's native name, Chuquimamani-Condori, on Bandcamp on July 25, 2019.

Personal life 
Crampton took piano and keyboard lessons as a child, but later started taking music seriously after her teenage years, around 2007 to 2008. She was born and grew up in the desert outside Barstow, California. Crampton lived a nomadic lifestyle, moving between the United States, Mexico, and Bolivia for most of her life. After finishing up her first studio album, American Drift, Elysia returned to  Bolivia, to care for her grandmother Flora.

Discography

As E+E

Full-length albums 
 E&E (2008, self-released)
 The Light that You gave Me to See You (2013, self-released; rereleased by Total Stasis in 2016)

Extended plays 
 Bound Adam (2011, self-released)
 Smile (2012, self-released)

Compilations 
 Edited/Remixed [2008–2012] (2014, self-released)

As Elysia Crampton

Studio albums 
 American Drift (2015, Blueberry Recordings)
 Elysia Crampton Presents: Demon City (2016, Break World Records)
 Spots y Escupitajo (2017, The Vinyl Factory)
 Elysia Crampton (2018, Break World Records)
 ORCORARA 2010 (2020, PAN)

Singles 
 Moth/Lake (2015, Boomkat Editions)
 Flora's Theme (2016, Williams Street Records)
 Final Exam ft. Kelela (2016, The Vinyl Factory)
 Solilunita (2018, Break World Records)

As Elysia Crampton Chuquimia 

 Selected Demos & DJ Edits [2007-2019] (2020, self-released)

As Chuquimamani-Condori 

 Quirquincho Medicine (2019, self-released)
 Uta Pachanqiri (2019, self-released)
 3 Demos (2020, self-released)

References 

1986 births
Living people
American LGBT musicians
LGBT people from California
LGBT people from Virginia
LGBT Native Americans
LGBT Hispanic and Latino American people
American people of Bolivian descent
American electronic musicians
Bolivian people of Aymara descent
Hispanic and Latino American musicians
People from Los Angeles
American women in electronic music
Transgender women musicians